Bundysburg is an unincorporated community in Geauga County, in the U.S. state of Ohio.

History
The first settlement at Bundysburg was made in 1815. The community was named for the local Bundy family. A post office was in operation in Bundysburg from 1830 until 1906.

References

Unincorporated communities in Geauga County, Ohio
Unincorporated communities in Ohio